Asidini is a tribe of darkling beetles in the subfamily Pimeliinae of the family Tenebrionidae. There are more than 30 genera in Asidini.

Genera
These genera belong to the tribe Asidini:

 Afrasida Wilke, 1922  (tropical Africa)
 Alphasida Escalera, 1905  (the Palearctic)
 Amachla Koch, 1962  (tropical Africa)
 Andremiopsis Chatanay, 1913  (tropical Africa)
 Andremius Fairmaire, 1903  (tropical Africa)
 Ardamimicus Smith, 2013  (North America)
 Asida Latreille, 1802  (the Palearctic)
 Asidesthes Fairmaire, 1900  (tropical Africa)
 Asidomorpha Koch, 1962  (tropical Africa)
 Bartolozzia Ferrer, 1998  (tropical Africa)
 Cardigenius Solier, 1836  (the Neotropics)
 Craniotus LeConte, 1851  (North America)
 Cryptasida Koch, 1962  (tropical Africa)
 Euryprosternum Chatanay, 1914  (tropical Africa)
 Ferveoventer Smith, 2013  (North America)
 Heterasida Casey, 1912  (North America)
 Kochotella Bouchard & Bousquet, 2021  (tropical Africa)
 Leptasida Chatanay, 1914  (tropical Africa)
 Litasida Casey, 1912  (North America)
 Machla Herbst, 1799  (tropical Africa)
 Machleida Fåhraeus, 1870  (tropical Africa)
 Machlomorpha Péringuey, 1899  (tropical Africa)
 Micrasida Smith, 2013  (North America)
 Microschatia Solier, 1836  (North America)
 Oxyge Chatanay, 1914  (tropical Africa)
 Pelecyphorus Solier, 1836  (North America)
 Philolithus Lacordaire, 1858  (North America)
 Prosodidius Fairmaire, 1903  (tropical Africa)
 Pseudasida Fairmaire, 1895  (tropical Africa)
 Saeculum Kaminski, Kanda & Smith, 2021  (tropical Africa)
 Scotinesthes Fairmaire, 1895  (tropical Africa)
 Scotinus W. Kirby, 1819  (the Neotropics)
 Stenomorpha Solier, 1836  (North America)
 Tamatasida Koch, 1962  (tropical Africa)

References

Further reading

External links

 

Pimeliinae